Suzanne Marie Bonamici (born October 14, 1954) is an American lawyer and politician serving as the U.S. representative for Oregon's 1st congressional district, a seat she was first elected to in a 2012 special election. The district includes most of Portland west of the Willamette River, as well as all of Yamhill, Columbia, Clatsop, and Washington counties.

A Democrat, Bonamici represented the 17th district in the Oregon State Senate from 2008 to 2011. She was first elected to the Oregon House of Representatives in 2006.

Early life, education, and legal career
Bonamici was born in Detroit and raised in a small Michigan town. She earned an associate degree from Lane Community College in 1978, and a bachelor's degree in 1980 and J.D. in 1983, both from the University of Oregon. After college, she became a legal assistant at Lane County Legal Aid in Eugene. After law school, she became a consumer protection attorney for the Federal Trade Commission in the nation's capital. She went into private practice in Portland and represented small businesses.

Oregon legislature

Elections
In 2006, incumbent Democratic State Representative Brad Avakian decided to retire to run for the Oregon Senate. Bonamici ran for the open seat in Oregon's 34th House district and defeated Republican Joan Draper, 62%-36%.

On April 30, 2008, commissioners from Washington and Multnomah Counties appointed Bonamici to represent Oregon's 17th Senate district. The seat became vacant when Avakian was appointed Commissioner of the Oregon Bureau of Labor and Industries. She was sworn in on May 19, 2008.

Bonamici was unopposed in the November 2008 special election for the balance of Avakian's four-year term, and was elected with 97% of the vote. In 2010, she was reelected with 64% of the vote.

U.S. House of Representatives

Elections
Special election

In early 2011, Bonamici was mentioned as a possible successor to Representative David Wu after The Oregonian and Willamette Week reported that Wu exhibited odd behavior and clashed with his staff amid apparent mental illness during the 2010 election cycle. After Wu resigned from Congress, Bonamici announced her candidacy for the special election to replace him, touting endorsements from former Governor Barbara Roberts, former Congresswoman Elizabeth Furse, and incumbent Oregon Attorney General John Kroger, among others.

On November 8, 2011, Bonamici won the Democratic Party of Oregon's nomination, with a majority of the vote in every county in the district and 66% of the vote overall, a 44-point margin over second-place finisher Brad Avakian. She defeated Republican nominee Rob Cornilles in the January 31, 2012, special election by a 14-point margin.

Before her election to Congress, Bonamici resigned from the Oregon Senate on November 21, and was replaced by Elizabeth Steiner Hayward in December.
 
2012 regular election

In November 2012, Bonamici was reelected to her first full term with over 60% of the vote.

Legislation

On July 31, 2014, Bonamici introduced the Tsunami Warning, Education, and Research Act of 2014 (H.R. 5309; 113th Congress) into the House. The bill would authorize the National Oceanic and Atmospheric Administration (NOAA) to spend $27 million a year for three years on their ongoing tsunami warning and research programs.

Bonamici said, "the coastlines of the United States already play an integral role in the economic prosperity of this country and we must strengthen their preparedness and resiliency so they can continue to play that role going forward." She added that the bill "will improve the country's understanding of the threat posed by tsunami events" because it will "improve forecasting and notification systems, support local community outreach and preparedness and response plans, and develop supportive technologies."

In January 2023, Bonamici was one of 13 cosponsors of an amendment to the Constitution of the United States extending the right to vote to citizens sixteen years of age or older.

Committee assignments
Committee on Science, Space and Technology
United States House Science Subcommittee on Environment 
United States House Science Subcommittee on Investigations and Oversight
Committee on Education and the Workforce
Subcommittee on Civil Rights and Human Services (Chair)
Subcommittee on Higher Education and Workforce Training
Select Committee on the Climate Crisis

Caucuses memberships
Congressional STEAM Caucus
Congressional Progressive Caucus.
Congressional Arts Caucus
Congressional Asian Pacific American Caucus
Climate Solutions Caucus
Medicare for All Caucus

Electoral history

* In the 2012 election, Steve Reynolds was co-nominated by the Libertarian and Pacific Green parties.

Personal life
Bonamici is married to Michael H. Simon, a federal judge. They have two children. Bonamici was raised Episcopalian and Unitarian, and subsequently converted to Judaism. She attends Congregation Beth Israel with her husband (who was born Jewish), and their children.

See also
 Women in the United States House of Representatives

References

External links

 Congresswoman Suzanne Bonamici official U.S. House website
 Suzanne Bonamici for Congress
 

 

|-

|-

|-

1954 births
21st-century American politicians
21st-century American women politicians
American women lawyers
American lawyers
American Jews from Oregon
Converts to Judaism from Christianity
Democratic Party members of the United States House of Representatives from Oregon
Female members of the United States House of Representatives
Former Anglicans
Jewish members of the United States House of Representatives
Jewish women politicians
Lane Community College alumni
Living people
Democratic Party members of the Oregon House of Representatives
Oregon lawyers
Democratic Party Oregon state senators
Politicians from Beaverton, Oregon
Politicians from Detroit
Simon family
University of Oregon alumni
University of Oregon School of Law alumni
Women state legislators in Oregon